Technomancer is a studio album by American electronic musician Pictureplane. It was released by Anticon on October 30, 2015. Music videos were created for "Self Control", "Technomancer", "Death Condition", and "Joyrider".

Production
Most of the album was created using the Access Virus synthesizer. Pictureplane also used an old desktop computer. Brad Hoss, Dre Skull, D Gookin, and Lars Stafford helped engineer the album. "Self Control" and "Live Forever" featured guest vocalist Grace Hall.

Pictureplane described it as "an album about our current relationship with technology and how it is defining our existence right now." The title of the album refers to "someone who uses technology for magical purposes."

Critical reception

Derek Staples of Spectrum Culture gave the album a 2.75 out of 5, calling it "an amalgam of androgynous lyricism, shoegaze electronics, second-wave acid techno and downtempo darkwave." Matt James of PopMatters gave the album 7 stars out of 10, saying: "It's anarchic, noisy, sweaty, somewhat scrappy at times, but a ton of fun."

Writing for Under the Radar, Tamaryn included it on her "Top 12 Albums of 2015" list.

Track listing

Personnel
Credits adapted from liner notes.
 Travis Egedy – artwork, layout, design, music
 Grace Hall – vocals (7, 11)
 Brad Hoss – mixing, engineering
 Dre Skull – mixing, engineering
 D Gookin – mixing, engineering
 Lars Stalfors – mixing, engineering
 Daddy Kev – mastering
 Ryan A. Rossi – skull isosurfaces

References

External links
 
 

2015 albums
Pictureplane albums
Anticon albums